The 1891 Springfield YMCA football team, also known as the Christian Workers and the Staggs, was an American football team that represented the International Young Men's Christian Association Training School—now known as Springfield College–as an independent during the 1891 college football season. Led by Amos Alonzo Stagg in his second and final season as head coach, the team compiled a record of 5–8–1. Stagg also played for the team at fullback and halfback. Springfield YMCA played their home games at Outing Park in Springfield, Massachusetts.

Schedule

References

Springfield Training School
Springfield Pride football seasons
Springfield Training School football